Herbert Arthur Loveitt (8 March 1874 – 18 February 1909) was a British rugby union player. He competed at the 1900 Summer Olympics and won silver as part of the Great Britain team in what was the first rugby union competition at an Olympic Games.

References

External links

 

1874 births
1909 deaths
Olympic rugby union players of Great Britain
British rugby union players
Olympic silver medallists for Great Britain
Rugby union players at the 1900 Summer Olympics
Medalists at the 1900 Summer Olympics
Rugby union players from Warwickshire
Rugby union fullbacks